Blainsburg is an unincorporated outlier community of West Brownsville, PA; by tradition a hamlet sized neighborhood with more actual housing acreage than West Brownsville proper in Washington County, Pennsylvania, United States. Named after a U.S. Senator, James G. Blaine . 
Blainsburg is part of the California Area School District . West Brownsville residence students attend Brownsville Area School District in Fayette County, Pennsylvania. The bedroom community is situated on the bluff above and slightly North-northwest of West Brownsville on the river bottom below.
Blainsburg is located alongside but above the climb PA Route 88 makes from the W. Brownsville river flats (Locally known as Blainsburg Hill Road) which bends right entering a shelf where it connects with the northwest streets of Blainsburg before taking a second ascent (now becoming California Road) towards California.  The parent and child communities are on the inside curve of a great meander in the Monongahela River in Southwestern Pennsylvania creating a degraded cut bank turned ramp and terrace on the opposite shore where Brownsville is situated. Blainsburg is often misspelled with an "E" in it, to match the spelling of its namesake, James G. Blaine. Blainsburg as of official records was founded in 1906 and is still spelled without the "E".

Geography
The majority of elevations in (very flat) West Brownsville average 770–780 ft, while only a short distance away the elevations in the larger street grid of Blainsburg run from 930–1040 feet. Measured at Pittsburgh Rd. The GoogleEarth ruler tool reports the distance between the two points is —a gradient of 18.57%—a very steep slope by any measure.

Pennsylvania Route 88 climbs roughly parallel (starting from farther south in West Brownsville and rises at slower rate, so the higher side of Blainsburg is actually atop a bluff lining and overlooking the more moderated climb of the highway. In addition, Blainsburg over looks a rail yard and an important railroad bridge built by the Monongahela Railroad tying the railroad wye, sidings, and small yard in Brownsville along Albany Road with the much larger yard in West Brownsville.

References

External links

Unincorporated communities in Washington County, Pennsylvania
Unincorporated communities in Pennsylvania